Sadojyat Shankarashram is the spiritual leader
 of the Chitrapur Saraswat Brahmin and Smartist Gaud Saraswat Brahmin community of India. He is the eleventh Mathadipathi (Head) of Chitrapur Math . It has its spiritual centre or 'math' at Shirali, Uttar Kannada district in Karnataka.

References 

1964 births
Living people
Spiritual teachers